Oumarou is a surname. Notable people with the surname include:

Aboubakar Oumarou (born 1987), Cameroonian football player
Bah Oumarou Sanda, Cameroonian diplomat
Ide Oumarou (1937–2002), Nigerian diplomat and politician
Karim Oumarou, Nigerien football player
Mamane Oumarou (born 1946), Nigerian politician
Sanda Bouba Oumarou (born 1958), Central African basketball player
Sanda Oumarou (1982–2021), Cameroonian football player
Seyni Oumarou (born 1951), Nigerien politician
Surnames of Nigerien origin